Northern Cyprus is one of the twenty-four participating countries and regions competing in the Turkvision Song Contest.

History

2013

Northern Cyprus made their debut in the  contest in Eskişehir, Turkey. Gommalar represented Northern Cyprus with the song "Havalanıyor", qualifying from the semi-final and placing 10th in the final with 175 points.

2014

On 20 July 2014 it was announced that Northern Cyprus would make their second appearance at the Turkvision Song Contest 2014 to be held in Kazan, Tatarstan in November 2014. It was announced on 19 September, that Northern Cyprus would hold their selection final on 19 October 2014. A total of four singers were selected to participate in the final, the result of the final were as follows:

The country of Northern Cyprus had initially selected İpek Amber to represent them at the Turkvision Song Contest 2014, with the song "Sessiz gidiş" (Silent leaving).  But it was later announced that it was highly likely they would have to withdraw due to political technicalities.  The singer was to enter Tatarstan using a Northern Cypriot passport.  However, due to the Cyprus dispute, the International recognition of Northern Cyprus as a self-declared state is not recognised by Russia, thus denying entry into Tatarstan, a federal subject of Russia.

Participation overview

References 

 
Turkvision
Countries in the Turkvision Song Contest